was a Japanese haikai poet. He was born in Kanazawa, and spent most of his life in Kyoto working as a doctor. Bonchō was one of Matsuo Bashō's leading disciples and, together with Kyorai, he edited the Bashō school's Monkey's Raincoat (Sarumino) anthology of 1689. He participated in numerous renku with Bashō and other members of his Shōmon school.

A famous hokku by Bonchō:

市中は物のにほひや夏の月　Machinaka ha / mono no nioi ya / natsu no tsuki

Downtown   the smells of things…   summer moon (trans. Sean Price)

References

External links 
 The Haiku and Poems of Nozawa Bonchō
, a 1691 renku (collaborative linked poem), by Bonchō, Bashō and Kyorai, translated by Sean Price

1640 births
1714 deaths
People from Kanazawa, Ishikawa
Japanese writers of the Edo period
17th-century Japanese poets
Japanese haiku poets